Khan Jaqmaq is one of the few remaining khans in the Old City of Damascus, it was built by the Mamluk emir, Sayf ad-Din Jaqmaq who was governor of Damascus in 1418–20. It was rebuilt to a great extent in 1601.

See also
Khan As'ad Pasha
Khan Sulayman Pasha
Khan Tuman

References

Buildings and structures completed in 1420
Caravanserais in Damascus
15th-century establishments in the Mamluk Sultanate